Sir Lamorak  (or Lamerak, Lamorac(k), Lamorat, Lamerocke, and other spellings) is a Knight of the Round Table in Arthurian legend. Introduced in the Prose Tristan, Lamorak reappears in later works including the Post-Vulgate Cycle and Thomas Malory's compilation Le Morte d'Arthur. Malory refers to him as Arthur's third best knight, only inferior to Lancelot and Tristan, and the Prose Tristan names his as one of the top five, but Lamorak was not exceptionally popular in the romance tradition, confined to the cyclical material and subordinate to more prominent characters.

Arthurian romance

Lamorak is one of the sons of King Pellinore and a brother of Aglovale, Drian, Percival, and Tor. His siblings may also include the Grail maiden Dindrane and others. Named after his uncle, who in his time had been one of the best knights of King Arthur's father Uther Pendragon, he gains fame for his strength, fiery temper, and feats of martial prowess, such as fighting off at least thirty knights by himself on more than one occasion. Lamorak's adventures often involve the Cornish prince Tristan, first as his mortal enemy, later turned his best friend.

Lamorak's death comes from how his father Pellinore, one of King Arthur's earliest royal allies, had once killed the rebellious King Lot of Orkney in battle. Ten years later, Lot's sons Gawain and Gaheris retaliated by slaying Pellinore in a duel. Lamorak, who meanwhile has joined Lot's sons at the Round Table, inflames the families' blood feud by having an affair with Lot's widow, Morgause. Morgause's son Gaheris catches the lovers in flagrante delicto while staying at Gawain's estate and promptly beheads her, letting her unarmed lover go. Lamorak reappears at a tournament and explains the situation to Arthur, but rejects the king's promise of protection at his court and enforcement of a truce between the two royal families. When Lamorak rides off alone, he is ambushed in a wood by Gawain and Gaheris along with their brothers Agravain and Mordred, who had just killed Drian. Together, the four unfairly fight him all at once for hours. Ultimately, it is Mordred who delivers a fatal blow on Lamorak from behind, after which Gawain beheads him.

Arthur learns of the murder and the suspicion falls on the Orkney brothers. Lamorak's cousin, named Avarlon in the Post-Vulgate Cycle and Pinel le Savage in Le Morte d'Arthur, later attempts to avenge Lamorak's murder by poisoning Gawain at Queen Guinevere's dinner party. However, the poison is accidentally taken by another knight (Gaheris of Carhaix / de Karaheu, unrelated to son of Lot), whose brother Mador de la Porte then blames the queen and demands Arthur to have her executed. Guinevere is saved when Lancelot fights Mador as her champion while the sorceress Nimue uncovers the truth behind the incident.

The Italian La Tavola Ritonda features his uncle named Lamorat de Listenois, a brother of Pellinore. He helps Tristan escape from the castle of the lustful fairy enchantress Medea, and is later accidentally killed by Dinadan's father known as the Good Knight Without Fear when the latter mistakes him for his enemy.

References

External links
King Arthur's Knights: Sir Lamorak

Arthurian characters
Fictional princes
Knights of the Round Table